Thomas Samuel Field (born February 22, 1987) is an American former professional baseball infielder. He played in Major League Baseball (MLB) for the Colorado Rockies, Los Angeles Angels of Anaheim, and Texas Rangers.

Professional career

Colorado Rockies
Field was drafted by the Colorado Rockies in the 24th round of the 2008 Major League Baseball Draft out of Texas State University. Field was assigned to the Short-Season A Tri-City Dust Devils, where in 56 games, Field hit .247 with 5 HR, 32 RBI and 10 SB.

Field played all of 2009 with the Single-A Asheville Tourists, where in 89 games, Field hit .257 with 2 HR, 32 RBI and 8 SB. Field played all of 2010 with the Class A-Advanced Modesto Nuts, where in 124 games, he hit .284 with 15 HR, 72 RBI and 16 SB. After the season, Field played with the Scottsdale Scorpions of the Arizona Fall League, where he hit .209 in 18 games.

Field began the 2011 season with the Double-A Tulsa Drillers, where in 134 games he hit .271 with 17 HR, 61 RBI and 9 SB. On September 11, he was called up to the Rockies. He made his debut that day, and recorded his first hit in his third game (second start), a single off of Shaun Marcum. In 16 games with the Rockies that year, he hit .271 with 3 RBI.

Field began 2012 with the Triple-A Colorado Springs Sky Sox. On July 28, Field was recalled when Marco Scutaro was traded to the San Francisco Giants, but was optioned back to Colorado Springs the next day when Jonathan Herrera was activated from the disabled list. He went 0-2 with a walk in his 2 game stint. In 121 games with Colorado Springs, he hit .246 with 8 HR, 49 RBI and 4 SB.

In 2 seasons with the Rockies, Field hit .260/.315/.260 in 18 games with 3 RBI and 0 XBH.

Minnesota Twins
On November 2, 2012 he was claimed off waivers by the Minnesota Twins.

Los Angeles Angels
On November 28, Field was claimed off of waivers by the Los Angeles Angels of Anaheim.

Field began 2013 with the Triple-A Salt Lake Bees. On April 20, Field was recalled when Mark Lowe was placed on the disabled list, but was optioned back to Salt Lake 3 days later when Nick Maronde was recalled. On July 20, Field was recalled to replace Brendan Harris, who was designated for assignment.

Pittsburgh Pirates
Field was designated for assignment on August 7, 2014. He was then claimed by the Pittsburgh Pirates on August 10, 2014. The Pirates designated Field for assignment on August 24, 2014.

Texas Rangers
He was signed by the Texas Rangers on December 16, 2014, to a minor league contract. Field made his Rangers' debut on May 11, 2015 against the Kansas City Royals and hit his first career homerun in the same game. He hit another homer on May 16, 2015 against the Cleveland Indians. He was designated for assignment by the Rangers on May 30.

During the 2015 season, Field, played for the Texas Rangers and the Rangers' Triple-A affiliate, Round Rock Express. In 14 games with the Rangers, Fields hit .195 with six runs, one double, two home runs and five RBIs. In 103 games with Round Rock, Field hit .247 with 51 runs, 23 doubles, three triples, 14 home runs and 44 RBIs.

Detroit Tigers
On December 11, 2015, Field signed a minor-league contract with the Detroit Tigers, and was invited to spring training. He was released by the Tigers on May 6, 2016.

Second stint with Twins
In December 2016, Field signed a minor league contract with the Minnesota Twins. He elected free agency on November 6, 2017 and chose to retire on January 19, 2018 rather than seek employment with another organization.

References

External links

1987 births
Living people
Asheville Tourists players
Baseball players from Austin, Texas
Colorado Rockies players
Colorado Springs Sky Sox players
Indianapolis Indians players
Los Angeles Angels players
Major League Baseball infielders
Modesto Nuts players
Rochester Red Wings players
Round Rock Express players
Salt Lake Bees players
Scottsdale Scorpions players
Texas Rangers players
Texas State Bobcats baseball players
Toledo Mud Hens players
Tri-City Dust Devils players
Tulsa Drillers players